The Lotus 18 was a race car designed by Colin Chapman for use by Lotus in Formula Junior, Formula Two, and Formula One.

Overview 
Lotus 18 was the first mid-engined car built by Lotus and was a marked improvement over Chapman's early and only moderately successful front-engined formula cars, the 12 and 16. It was introduced for the 1960 F1, F2 and FJ seasons, with about 27 examples of the F1 and F2 versions and 110 of the FJ versions. As a stop-gap before the introduction of the 18's successor models, the Lotus 20 for F2/FJ and 21 for F1, some 18 chassis were rebodied with 21 skins to create the interim Lotus 18/21 hybrid derivative.

The 18 was replaced by the Lotus 21 in Formula One and the Lotus 20 in Formula Junior in 1961.

Design
The car was a classic Chapman design, being extremely light and simple; the body was made up of lightweight panels bolted to heavily-triangulated tube frame (spaceframe) chassis. Thus the car was rigid, strong and light, maintaining the 16's forward weight distribution despite the engine moving behind the driver.It was powered initially by a 2,467 cc Coventry Climax FPF (3.70" x 3.50") four cylinder DOHC engine inherited from the Grand Prix version of Lotus 16.   In 1960, the FPF was enlarged slightly to 2497 cc (3.70" x 90 mm), which produced 239 hp (178 kW) at 6,750 rpm from a weight of only 290 lbs (132 kg) and had a wide torque range.

The 2.5 litre engine was replaced by a 1.5 Litre (82 mm x 71 mm) Climax FPF Mk.II with new Formula One engine rules in 1961.  The Formula Junior variant used a 998 cc Cosworth Mk.III or a Downton BMC "A" Series with 948cc displacement.  The Formula Junior version also used smaller gauge chassis tubing and Alfin drum brakes on all four corners.

Further contributing to the weight advantage was the adoption of lightweight sequential manual transmission originally developed for Lotus 12 by Richard Ansdale and Harry Mundy incorporating the unique sequential-shifting motorcycle gearbox, and a ZF limited-slip differential in a common Magnesium alloy housing to form a transaxle, which also provided the mounting points for inboard rear brakes.  This gearbox had been improved in its reliability for Lotus 15 and 16 in 1957-58 by Keith Duckworth, who had just joined Lotus as a gearbox engineer.

Although Porsche in Austria pioneered the sequential-shifting gearbox for racing cars, with the Type 360 Cisitalia, the idea was relatively new and the original transaxle in the Lotus 12, which was essentially an enlarged motorcycle gearbox, combined with ZF limited-slip differential, had gained the nickname "Queerbox", or "Gearbox-full of neutrals" for its poor reliability.  With Duckworth having left to form Cosworth in 1958, Mike Costin, who, despite being the co-founder of Cosworth, remained with Lotus for a while longer, adopted the improved Queerbox in the Lotus 16, into a configuration for directly mounting it behind the engine for Lotus 18 with dedicated oil scavenge and pressure feed pumps, further improving its reliability while retaining the small and light design.

Formula Junior version utilized the Renault 4-speed transaxle, and both of the Lotus transaxle and this Renault 'box had the gear shifter lever on the left side of the driver. An optional gearbox was the VW gearbox with Hewland 4 speed gears. This last gearbox has the added advantage of being able to change gear ratios from behind the gearbox without removing the gearbox from the car.

The front suspension was by double-wishbone arms with an outboard coil/damper unit.  Unlike Chapman's former designs where the ends of the anti-roll bar acted as a leg of the upper wishbone, the 18 had a separate front anti-roll bar.  The rear suspension was by upper and lower radius arms with a reversed lower wishbone, where the fixed-length half-shaft acted as the upper-link.  The coil/damper unit was also mounted outboard in the rear, and the 18 sometimes ran with and without the rear anti-roll bar.

In order to capitalize on the weight advantage, Chapman designed a light, sleek machine only 28 inches (71 cm) high (excluding windscreen) and weighing just 980 lbs (440 kg). To help facilitate this, the driver was placed in a semi-reclining position, pioneered about a decade before by Gustav Baumm of NSU.

Racing history 
The Lotus 18 had remarkably good handling with a unique suspension system which drastically reduced weight transfer and body roll in cornering. Shortly, the Lotus 18 was proving to be faster than any car Grand Prix racing had ever seen, eclipsing even the legendary Auto Unions and being widely copied. It was also built as a two-seat sports-racer called the Lotus 19 or Monte Carlo.The car took Lotus' first F1 victory, by Innes Ireland in the non-championship Glover Trophy, on 8 April 1960. Its first World Championship win happened six weeks later, on 29 May, albeit by privateer Rob Walker, who leased the car from Chapman. Driven by Stirling Moss the car took a dominant win at the 1960 Monaco Grand Prix. It was an early taste of things to come. Moss also won the United States Grand Prix at the end of the season helping Lotus finish second in the constructors' championship.

Moss repeated his win in a legendary race at Monaco the following year, beating off the more powerful and faster 'sharknose' Ferraris. He then won at the fearsome Nürburgring in changeable weather, while Innes Ireland took a third win in the USA to help Lotus finish second in the constructors' championship in 1961. The Lotus 18 was also notable for giving Jim Clark his first Grand Prix start in 1960.

The Belgian Grand Prix at Spa in 1960 was notable for Moss's accident in the Rob Walker 18 in practice which kept him from the race and the death of Alan Stacey when he left the track in his 18 apparently following a bird strike in the face.

Complete Formula One results

Championship results 
(key) (Results in bold indicate pole position; results in italics indicate fastest lap.) 

* Includes points scored by other Lotus models

Non-Championship results 
(key)

References

Lotus Formula Juniors 1960-1963 - Robinshaw & Bouckley

18
Formula Two cars
Formula Junior cars
Tasman Series cars